Riverside is an unincorporated community on the eastern banks of the Shenandoah River in southern Jefferson County, West Virginia, United States.

References

Unincorporated communities in Jefferson County, West Virginia
Unincorporated communities in West Virginia